TOF may refer to:
 The Original Factory Shop, a British discount department store
 Time of flight, a principle of several scientific methods
 Time-of-flight camera, a camera system that analyzes time of flight of the light it captures, to resolve depth
 Time-of-flight mass spectrometry uses the time of flight of an ion in the gas phase to resolve its mass-to-charge ratio
 Tetralogy of Fallot, a congenital heart defect
 TOF, British abbreviation for Tracheoesophageal fistula, an abnormal connection between the esophagus and the trachea
 Turnover frequency, a rate in chemical reactions
 TOF, IATA airport code for Bogashevo Airport, in Tomsk, Russia
 Torch of Freedom, a novel by David Weber
 TOF, MTR station code for Tong Fong Tsuen stop, in Hong Kong
 TOF (Top of Form), relates to the print start position i.e. the position the printer starts printing from at the top of the page
 Tower of Fantasy, a video game

Tof may refer to:
 Tof, alternate term for the Tofalar people of Siberian Russia
The timbrel or hand-drum in the Hebrew music of Old Testament times
Tof, green-skinned humanoids from planet Tof, from the Star Wars universe